Ferruccio Dalla Torre (sometimes shown as Ferruccio dalla Torre; 4 November 1931 – 12 March 1987) was an Italian bobsledder who competed from the late 1950s to the mid-1960s. He won three medals in the four-man event at the FIBT World Championships with one gold (1963) and two silvers (1959, 1962).

Dalla Torre also finished fourth in the four-man event at the 1964 Winter Olympics in Innsbruck.

References

External links
 
 Bobsleigh four-man world championship medalists since 1930
 Wallenchinsky, David (1984). "Bobsled: Four-man". In The Complete Book of the Winter Olympics: 1896 - 1980. New York: Penguin Books. p. 561.

1931 births
1987 deaths
Bobsledders at the 1964 Winter Olympics
Olympic bobsledders of Italy
Italian male bobsledders
Ferruccio